Chrysorabdia alpina is a moth of the subfamily Arctiinae. It is found in Tibet.

References

Lithosiini
Moths described in 1900